This list of cemeteries in New Mexico includes currently operating, historical (closed for new interments), and defunct (graves abandoned or removed) cemeteries, columbaria, and mausolea which are historical and/or notable. It does not include pet cemeteries.

Bernalillo County 

 Albuquerque Indian School Cemetery, 4H Park, Albuquerque

Catron County 
 Cooney's Tomb and Cemetery, Alma

Colfax County 

 Dawson Cemetery, Dawson; NRHP-listed

Grant County 
 Fort Bayard National Cemetery, Silver City; NRHP-listed

Santa Fe County 
 Fairview Cemetery, Santa Fe; NRHP-listed
 Nuestra Senora de Luz Church and Cemetery, Canoncito; NRHP-listed
 Santa Fe National Cemetery, Santa Fe

See also
 List of cemeteries in the United States
 Pioneer cemetery

References

New Mexico